Clergy and other religious figures have generally represented a popular outlet for pop culture. Some of the more popular clergy, members of religious orders, and other religious personages featured in works of fiction are listed below.

All names on list are in Western order (first name, last name) when applicable.

Christianity

Catholic Church

Monks and friars
 Frère Jacques
 The Monk – The Canterbury Tales by Geoffrey Chaucer
 Friar Tuck – Robin Hood
 Ambrosio - The Monk
 William of Baskerville (Franciscan) – The Name of the Rose novel and film
 Brother Cadfael – protagonist of historical mystery novels by Ellis Peters

Nuns
 The Second Nun – The Canterbury Tales by Geoffrey Chaucer
 Sister Fidelma – protagonist of historical mystery novels by Peter Tremayne
 Ciel – Character from Tsukihime and the Melty Blood series

Priests
 Claude Frollo – The Hunchback of Notre-Dame
 Father John Brown – created by G. K. Chesterton
 Father Ted Crilly – Father Ted TV series
 Father Dámaso – Noli Me Tángere
 Mr. Eko – Lost
 Betheal Gavarre (Belial) – Priest manhwa
 Father Dougal McGuire – Father Ted TV series
 Father John Mulcahy – M*A*S*H   TV series and film
 The Nun's Priest – The Canterbury Tales by Geoffrey Chaucer
 The Pardoner – The Canterbury Tales by Geoffrey Chaucer
 The Parson – The Canterbury Tales by Geoffrey Chaucer
 Father Guido Sarducci – Vatican gossip columnist played by comedian Don Novello on Saturday Night Live and other TV shows and films
 Don Camillo Tarocci – Giovannino Guareschi's tales
 Nicholas D. Wolfwood – Trigun
 Enrico Pucci – JoJo's Bizarre Adventure: Stone Ocean
 Kirei Kotomine – "Fate/stay Night"

Bishops
 Bishop René d'Herblay of Vannes – the D'Artagnan Romances novels of Alexandre Dumas, père

Popes
 Pope Joan – 9th Century Legendary Figure
 Pope Urban X – Candide (1759 satire)
 Pope Hadrian VII – Hadrian the Seventh (1904 novel)
 Pope John XXIV – Lord of the World (1907 novel)
 Pope Kiril I – The Shoes of the Fisherman (1968 film)
 Pope Sixtus VII – Good News from the Vatican (1971 short story)
 Pope Urban IX – Urban the Ninth (1973 novel)
 Pope Marx I – Marx the First (1975 novel)
 Pope Peter II – Peter the Second (1976 novel)
 Pope Francis I – The Vicar of Christ (1979 novel)
 Pope John XXIX – The Last World (1988 short story)
 Pope John Paul I (Cardinal Lamberto) – The Godfather Part III (1990 film)
 Pope David I – The Pope Must Die (1991 film)
 Pope Pius XX – 3001: The Final Odyssey (1997 novel)
 Pope Genevieve G. Rota – Lexx (1997 TV series)
 Pope Peter II – The Accidental Pope (2000 novel)
 Pope Oswald Leopold II – Battle Pope (2000 comic book series)
 Pope Peter II – The Third Secret (2005 novel)
 Pope Marcellus IX – Through Darkest Europe (2018 novel)
 Pope Pius XIII – The Young Pope (2016 TV series) and The New Pope (2020 TV series)
 A separate Pope Pius XIII - Oblivion (2012 novel)
 Pope Francis II - The New Pope (2020 TV series)
 Pope John Paul III – The New Pope (2020 TV series)

Saints
 Saint Grobian – a fictional patron saint of vulgar and coarse people in various late Medieval satirical works.

Other 

 Dean Jocelin - Dean of the cathedral in William Golding's The Spire.

Eastern Orthodox Church

Nuns
 Sister Pelagia – Pelagia and the White Bulldog and sequels by Boris Akunin

Anglican/Episcopal churches

Priests
 William Collins – Pride and Prejudice, novel by Jane Austen; also several film and TV adaptations
 Leonard Clement – The Murder at the Vicarage, novel by Agatha Christie
 Theodore Venables – The Nine Tailors, novel by Dorothy L. Sayers
 Reverend Doctor Christopher Syn – Doctor Syn series of novels by Russell Thorndike
 Josiah Crawley – Chronicles of Barsetshire series of novels by Anthony Trollope
 Theophilus Grantly – Chronicles of Barsetshire series of novels by Anthony Trollope
 Dr Vesey Stanhope – Chronicles of Barsetshire series of novels by Anthony Trollope
 Mark Robarts – Chronicles of Barsetshire series of novels by Anthony Trollope
 Father Gabriel Stokes – The Walking Dead
 Ashley Thomas – Emmerdale
 Harriet Finch – Emmerdale
Charles Anderson – Emmerdale
 Billy Mayhew – Coronation Street
 Adam Smallbone – Rev.
 Father Jack – Six Feet Under
 Sidney Chambers – Grantchester
 Daniel Webster – The Book of Daniel
 Canon John Tallis – works of Madeleine L'Engle
 Geraldine Granger — The Vicar of Dibley

Bishops
 Bishop Proudie of Barchester – Chronicles of Barsetshire series of novels by Anthony Trollope

Mormonism

Fundamentalist leaders
 The Prophet Bill Henrickson (Bill Paxton) – Big Love
 The Prophet Roman Grant (Harry Dean Stanton) – Big Love

Other Protestants

Baptist ministers
The Reverend Jesse Custer – Preacher, comic created by Garth Ennis and Steve Dillon
 Chaplain Captain Albert T. Tappman – Catch-22, novel by Joseph Heller

Methodist ministers
 Father Mapple – Moby-Dick
 Brother Justin Crow – an aspiring radio preacher in Carnivàle
 Norman Balthus – Brother Justin's guardian and mentor in Carnivàle

Non-denominational/other/unspecified/fictional Protestant
 Derrial Book, Shepherd – Firefly
 Caleb – Buffy the Vampire Slayer
 Eric Camden – 7th Heaven
 Ivan Isaacs – Priest manhwa
 Reverend Timothy Lovejoy – The Simpsons ("American Presbylutheran")
 Reverend Harry Powell – unspecified in The Night of the Hunter (1953)
 Reverend William Stryker – Marvel Comics
 Reverend Orville Swanson – Congregationalist in Red Dead Redemption 2

Unspecified/pre-schism/other religious workers
 Prester John – Christian priest-king of medieval legend
The Reverend Ashley Thomas –  Emmerdale

Shinto

Miko
(Names are listed by alphabetically by given name in the western convention of given-name, surname for clarity.)

 Arashi Kishū – X
 Ayako Matsuzaki – Ghost Hunt
 Chikane Himemiya and Himeko Kurusugawa – Kannazuki no Miko
 Kagome Higurashi, Kikyo, and Kaede – Inuyasha
 Kagami Hiiragi and Tsukasa Hiiragi – Lucky Star
 Kaho Mizuki – Cardcaptor Sakura
 Momiji – Ninja Gaiden and Dead or Alive
 Nozomi Tojo - Love Live! School Idol Project
 Koyori – Samurai Aces
 Pocky – Pocky & Rocky
 Sailor Mars (Rei Hino) – Sailor Moon
 Sakura Miko – Hololive 
 Rika Furude – Higurashi: When They Cry
 Reimu Hakurei and Sanae Kochiya – Touhou Project
 Saya Kisaragi – Blood-C
 Togashi – Sengoku Blade
 Princess Tomoyo – Tsubasa: Reservoir Chronicle
 Yae Miko and Sangonomiya Kokomi – Genshin Impact
 Yae Sakura – Honkai Impact 3rd

Buddhism

Mahayana

Monks
 Kwai Chang Caine (Shaolin) – Kung Fu
 Hoichi the Earless (Zen)

Monks from Mortal Kombat
Unless specified, all belong to the Shaolin discipline.
 Liu Kang
 Kung Lao

Shamanism

Ainu religion
 Nakoruru and Rimururu – Samurai Shodown

North American shamanist
 Nightwolf – Mortal Kombat video game series

Judaism
 Rabbi David Small – The Rabbi Small Mysteries (the first book is Friday the Rabbi Slept Late)
 Rabbi Avram – The Frisco Kid film

Other/unclassified
 Dhalsim, Hindu ascetic – Street Fighter video game series
 Marcus Didius Falco – Procurator of the Sacred Geese (he also officiated some wedding ceremonies)

See also
 List of religious ideas in science fiction
 List of religious ideas in fantasy fiction

References

External link

Clergy